X Factor is an Italian television music competition to find new singing talent; the winner receives a recording contract with Sony Music., Mara Maionchi is the only judge who will return from last season, while Samuel, Malika Ayane and Sfera Ebbasta and is the new entry; also Alessandro Cattelan was confirmed as host. The thirdteen season was aired on Sky Uno and TV8 since September 2019. Sofia Tornambene won the competition and Sfera Ebbasta became the winning coach for the first time.

Judges' houses
The "Home Visit" is the final phase before the Live Shows. In this phase, the contestants who passed the "Bootcamp" had to perform one last time in front of their specific judge, in four different locations. At the end of this audition, the top twelve contestants were chosen.

The eight eliminated acts were:
Boys: Daniel Acerboni, Emanuele Crisanti (Nuela)
Girls: Silvia Cesana (Sissi), Beatrice Giliberti
25+: Tomas Tai, Gabriele Troisi
Groups: K_Mono, Kyber

Contestants and categories
Key:
 – Winner
 – Runner-up
 – Third place

Live shows

Results summary
The number of votes received by each act will be released by Sky Italia after the final.

Colour key

Live show details

Week 1 (24 October)

Judges' votes to eliminate
 Ebbasta: Enrico Di Lauro - backed his own act, Mariam Rouass.
 Ayane: Mariam Rouass - backed her own act, Enrico Di Lauro.
 Samuel: Mariam Rouass - gave no reason.
 Maionchi: Enrico Di Lauro - gave no reason.

With the acts in the sing-off receiving two votes each, the result was deadlocked and a new public vote commenced for 200 seconds. Mariam Rouass was eliminated as the act with the fewest public votes.

Week 2 (31 October)

Judge's vote to eliminate
 Ebbasta: Enrico Di Lauro - gave no reason.
 Ayane: Marco Saltari - backed her own act, Enrico Di Lauro.
 Samuel: Enrico Di Lauro - gave no reason.
 Maionchi: Enrico Di Lauro - backed her own act, Marco Saltari.

Week 3 (7 November)

Judge's vote to eliminate
 Ebbasta: Lorenzo Rinaldi - backed his own act, Giordana Petralia.
 Ayane: Giordana Petralia - backed her own act, Lorenzo Rinaldi.
 Samuel: Lorenzo Rinaldi - gave no reason.
 Maionchi: Lorenzo Rinaldi - gave no reason.

Week 4 (14 November)

Judges' votes to eliminate
 Ebbasta: Seawards - backed his own act, Girodana Petralia.
 Ayane: Seawards - gave no reason.
 Samuel: Girodana Petrali - backed his own act, Seawards.
 Maionchi: Seawards - gave no reason.

Week 5 (21 November)

There was no elimination that week; the act with the fewest votes sang again in the final showdown in week 6.

Week 6: Quarter-final (28 November)

Judges' vote to eliminate
 Ebbasta: Davide Rossi - backed his own act, Giordana Petralia.
 Ayane: Giordana Petralia - backed her own act, Davide Rossi.
 Samuel: Giordana Petralia - gave no reason.
 Maionchi: Giordana Petralia - gave no reason.

Judges' votes to eliminate
 Maionchi: Davide Rossi - backed her own act, Nicola Cavallaro
 Ayane: Nicola Cavallaro - backed her own act, Davide Rossi
 Ebbasta: Nicola Cavallaro - gave no reason.
 Samuel: Nicola Cavallaro - gave no reason.

Week 7: Semi-final (5 December)

Judge's vote to eliminate
 Maionchi: Booda - backed her own act, Eugenio Campagna.
 Samuel: Eugenio Campagna - backed his own act, Booda.
 Ebbasta: Eugenio Campagna - gave no reason.
 Ayane: Eugenio Campagna - gave no reason.

Week 8: Final (12 December)

References

External links
 X Factor Italia

2019 Italian television seasons
Italian music television series
Italy 13
X Factor (Italian TV series)